Leonid Ivanovych Hrach, also as Leonid Ivanovich Grach, is a Soviet, Ukrainian, and Russian politician.

Biography
Hrach was born in a town of Brodetske, Vinnytsia Oblast on 1 January 1948.

He was a chairman of the Verkhovna Rada of Crimea in 1998–2002 and the 1st secretary of the Crimean republican committee of CPU in 1991. Hrach stayed the leader of communists in Crimea until 2010 when he was officially excluded from communists ranks by leadership of the Communist Party of Ukraine.

After the annexation of Crimea by the Russian Federation in 2014, Hrach joined the Russian political party Communists of Russia along with the Crimean republican committee of the Communist Marxist–Leninist Party of Ukraine.

See also
 1994 Crimean presidential election

Notes

References

External links
 Leonid Hrach personal website as member of the Communists of Russia
 Crimean Oblast at the Handbook on history of the Communist Party and the Soviet Union 1898–1991
 Crimean ASSR at the Handbook on history of the Communist Party and the Soviet Union 1898–1991
 Ukraine at worldstatesmen.org
 Matola, V. In Ukraine are registered 14 pro-Russian parties. The Ukrainian Week. 21 May 2013.

1948 births
Living people
People from Vinnytsia Oblast
Kuban State University alumni
Communist Party of Ukraine politicians
Communist Party of Ukraine (Soviet Union) politicians
Kyiv Higher Party School alumni
Communists of Russia politicians
Governors of Crimean Oblast
Fourth convocation members of the Verkhovna Rada
Fifth convocation members of the Verkhovna Rada
Sixth convocation members of the Verkhovna Rada
Communist Party of Workers and Peasants politicians
Recipients of the Order of Prince Yaroslav the Wise, 5th class